Nikonov and Nikonova are masculine and feminine forms of a common Russian surname. Notable people with the surname include:

Alexander Nikonov (1893–1937), a Soviet military leader.
Gennadiy Nikonov (1950–2003), a Russian gun engineer. 
Vadim Nikonov (b. 1948), a Soviet football player and coach.
Vyacheslav Nikonov (b. 1956), a Russian political scientist.
Yevgeny Nikonov (1920–1941), a Russian war hero.
Angelina Nikonova (b. 1976), a Russian filmmaker, script writer and film producer.
Elena Nikonova, a Russian pair skater.
Matrona Nikonova (1881–1952), a canonized saint of the Russian Orthodox Church.
Ry Nikonova (1942–2014), Russian artist, poet, and writer.
Valentina Nikonova (b. 1952), a Soviet fencer.
Yevgeniya Nikonova (b. 1970), a Russian basketball player.

Russian-language surnames